This is a list of Swedish television related events from 2012.

Events
23 March - Ulf Nilsson wins the first season of The Voice Sverige.
26 May - Sweden wins the 57th Eurovision Song Contest in Baku, Azerbaijan. The winning song is "Euphoria", performed by Loreen.
1 June - Footballer Anton Hysén and his partner Sigrid Bernson win the seventh season of Let's Dance.
3 June - Hanna Johansson wins the sixth season of Big Brother.
9 September - Launch of the Swedish version of The X Factor.
7 December - Awa Santesson-Sey wins the first season of X Factor.

Debuts

International
9 April -  Alcatraz (2012) (TV4)

Television shows

2000s
Let's Dance (2006–present)

2010s
1–24 December - Mysteriet på Greveholm: Grevens återkomst

Ending this year
Big Brother Sverige (2000-2004, 2011-2012)

Births

Deaths

See also
2012 in Sweden

References